White Light/White Heat is the second studio album by American rock band the Velvet Underground. Released on January 30, 1968, on Verve Records, it was the band's last studio recording with multi-instrumentalist and founding member John Cale. Recorded after Reed fired Andy Warhol, who had produced their debut album The Velvet Underground & Nico, they hired Steve Sesnick as a manager and hired producer Tom Wilson who had worked on the band's debut. White Light/White Heat was engineered by Gary Kellgren.

The album includes lyrically transgressive themes like their debut, exploring topics such as sex, amphetamines, and drag queens. Reed was inspired by a variety of authors, including William S. Burroughs and Alice Bailey, and the lyrics create a cast of characters, such as in "The Gift" and those named in "Sister Ray". Musically, he took influence from jazz music and players such as saxophonist Ornette Coleman. Warhol conceived the album's cover art, although he is officially uncredited.

White Light/White Heat was recorded quickly and modeled after the band's live sound and techniques of improvisation, since they often played loud with new equipment from an endorsement deal with Vox. However, the final product was compressed and distorted-–most members were dissatisfied with the final product and it was followed with the less experimental The Velvet Underground the following year; Cale would leave the band later in 1968. The distortion level became a prototype for punk rock and noise rock. The 17-minute "Sister Ray" is widely considered the standout track by critics and fans.

White Light/White Heat sold fewer copies than The Velvet Underground & Nico, and peaked at 199 on the Billboard Top LPs chart. The album's only single, "White Light/White Heat", failed to chart, which the band blamed on airplay bans and lack of promotion from Verve. The album was dismissed by many contemporary mainstream music critics, although underground newspapers took notice. Ultimately, White Light/White Heat had a hugely significant impact on early forms of punk rock and no wave and has appeared on several lists of the greatest albums of all time.

Background 
After the disappointing sales of the Velvet Underground's first album, The Velvet Underground & Nico (1967), their relationship with Andy Warhol deteriorated. They toured throughout most of 1967, and many of their live performances featured noisy improvisations that became key elements on White Light/White Heat. The band fired Warhol, parted ways with Nico (which she would describe as being fired), and recorded their second album with Tom Wilson credited as producer. Jack Donohue, writing for Tech, the student newspaper of MIT, would be one of the first to announce that the band were working on a follow-up. The band had access to new electronics through an endorsement deal with Vox. The sound of the album was designed from the beginning to be against the Summer of Love in San Francisco and also to capture their live sound.

Steve Sesnick was chosen as the replacement manager for the band, and he was accepted by all band members except bassist John Cale; drummer Moe Tucker even considered him a fifth member of the group. Singer Lou Reed influenced the album with his obsession with astrology, especially his interest in the Virgo-Pisces astrological opposition. Rehearsal was similar to the band's debut, with the band's best pieces being reworked mostly in the studio. However, Cale would state that no one in the band "had the patience to rehearse" the album, even after numerous attempts to do so.

Recording 

The album was recorded in a short time frame, and with a noticeably different style from that of The Velvet Underground & Nico. Decades after its release, John Cale (in the liner notes of Peel Slowly and See) described White Light/White Heat as "a very rabid record... The first one had some gentility, some beauty. The second one was consciously anti-beauty." Sterling Morrison, the lead guitarist, said: "We were all pulling in the same direction. We may have been dragging each other off a cliff, but we were all definitely going in the same direction." Tucker would estimate that the album took two weeks to record, with about seven recording sessions. It was "almost" recorded in one day—the band would not "accommodate what [they] were trying to do due to the limitations of the studio", according to Morrison. They were well prepared, and the tension between Cale and Reed wasn't apparent in the studio.

White Light/White Heat was recorded in September 1967 at Mayfair Sound Studios at Seventh Avenue in Manhattan, with work to form its songs being done in the previous summer. The band specifically passed on songs that sounded gentler—though Cale also said that the band simply didn't have enough songs prepared for recording, which led to a reduced track list. White Light/White Heat would have far more involvement from Wilson, who originally only produced "Sunday Morning" on The Velvet Underground & Nico; however, he would not participate heavily, as he would talk to his girlfriends for most of the time.

Reed purposefully wanted to go "as high and as hard as we could". At the time, Reed played a 12-string guitar, Gibson, and Epiphone guitars; he also used Vox amplifiers. The band also used Vox distortion pedals to the fullest extent; recording engineer Gary Kellgren reportedly said "you can't do it – all the needles are on red" during the recording sessions. To get the sound of a character receiving a blade through their skull in "The Gift", Reed stabbed or smashed a cantaloupe, at the request of Frank Zappa, who was recording in the same studio. For "Sister Ray", the band worked individually instead of coordinating together–the drums were drowned out due to the level of noise. The song was intentionally recorded in one take to prevent constant shifting of the sound of it, which was what happened with "Heroin" on the previous record. Tucker was disappointed with the final product, as Wilson forgot to turn on some of her drum microphones while recording. According to Reed, Kellgren walked out during the recording of "Sister Ray".

"I Heard Her Call My Name" was remixed by Reed after the recording process to boost his vocals, which Tucker said ruined the sound of the song. Morrison considered the album a technical failure, additionally citing "I Hear Her Call My Name"; Morrison would quit the band for a couple of days in response. While mixing the album, Reed discovered how the sound of it was distorted since the band played too loudly, and the band couldn't resolve the issue as they had limited studio time. Cale said the band neglected how playing loud would affect the technical quality of the record, and Morrison concluded that it was "doomed" due to its level of distortion and compression. Before its release, Wilson resigned from MGM Records, the owner of the band's label at the time, and would never work with the band again.

Content 
White Light/White Heat has been described as experimental rock, noise rock, proto-punk and art rock. Record Mirror called it a "menacing set of acid-rock tunes." "White Heat", at the time, was a slang term for the speed rush from amphetamine. The record's lyrics vary from themes of drug use to sexual references (such as fellatio and orgies), such as the title track "White Light/White Heat", which implies intravenous use of methamphetamine. "Here She Comes Now" is built around a double-entendre. On the album's last track, "Sister Ray", Reed tells a tale of debauchery involving drag queens having a failed orgy. Reed eventually commented on how "Sister Ray" was ahead of its time, particularly its early form of heavy metal.

Side one 
The record opens with "White Light/White Heat" which details the physical effects of amphetamine usage. It consists of a simple two-chord progression of G5 and A5, and contains elements of both heavy metal and doo-wop. It is one of the album's songs that has more traditional rock'n'roll elements, and while discussing amphetamine it is also equally influenced by one of Reed's favorite books, Alice Bailey's A Treatise on White Magic, which inspired the phrase "White Light". Reed was interviewed by a radio station in Oregon, which Richie Unterberger summarizes:

"The Gift" is a spoken word track whose lyrics and musical backing are separated by left and right stereo channels, described by Wilson as the band having "stereo prefrontal lobes". The story is derived from another story Reed wrote for Shelley Albin, his middle school girlfriend. The song itself is derived from a story Reed penned at Syracuse University. It discusses two characters, Marsha and Waldo, over guitar feedback in the form of a blues-rock instrumental. This would be Cale's first vocal performance for the band, and it showed the group's improvisational roots.

"Lady Godiva's Operation" contains a lyrical style influenced by William S. Burroughs. Partially inspired by his teenage experience with electroshock treatments, the track is another of Reed's short stories set to music, but is more instrumentally advanced than "The Gift". Cale adds backing vocals, which are "sung" rather than spoken, and he shuddered and imitated the sounds of an oxygen machine while recording the track. What type of operation Lady Godiva is undertaking is unclear, though it seems to be about a transsexual and related to sex change; Reed sings about gender-altering surgery, as seen in the lines "Doctor arrives with knife and baggage / sees the growth as just so much cabbage".

The title of "Here She Comes Now" is a double entendre. The song was written to be sung by Nico, before the band fell out with her. A folk rock song, it is the only track on the album that resembles contemporary rock. It is also the only song that would be jointly credited to Reed, Cale, and Morrison.

Side two 

"I Heard Her Call My Name" is a love song for a dead girl. Reed's guitar playing was inspired by Jimi Hendrix, and the song has been described as free jazz with "banshee-like guitar breaks" by Unterberger. It has elements of garage-rock, while the guitar solo was influenced by jazz saxophonist Ornette Coleman. Reed biographer Howard Sounes summarized the track as "[Tucker] maintaining a frantic beat as [Reed] delivered a speed rap ending with a mind-splitting guitar solo".

Reed said in a Rolling Stone interview that "Sister Ray" was included at the suggestion of Warhol, who asked that he "gotta make sure that you do the 'sucking on my ding-dong' song". The track was written on a train home from a poor performance in Connecticut. Reed explained the song as "a bunch of drag queens taking some sailors home with them, shooting up on smack and having this orgy when the police appear". The title named is after a drag queen. The song also has free jazz influences from Reed's interest in Coleman and Cecil Taylor; it is mostly improvisation. Wilson produced Taylor's album Jazz Advance earlier in 1956. The song tells this story through a cast of characters, which Soumes noted is reminiscent of Reed's general songwriting style: it is "a semi-abstract story with use of repetition and drug slang, also playing with the sounds of words, stuttering and jamming words together". Soumes also noted that it contains similar themes to Reed's favorite and most influential books, Hubert Selby Jr.'s Last Exit to Brooklyn (1964) and John Rechy's City of Night (1963). The instrumental jam was spontaneous, as Reed desired, and it also has no bass guitar. The guitars in the track created a "dense musical backdrop" to its lyrics before a distorted electric organ, played by Cale, joined in. Tucker would state that it was more than just noise, as everyone playing still followed Tucker's beat. The third verse contains explicit sexual references, which was rare for Reed, particularly in the line "She's just suckin' on my ding dong/I'm searchin' for my mainline".

Release 

The title track "White Light/White Heat" was released as a single in November 1967 but failed commercially. The B-side was "Here She Comes Now"; these tracks are the two shortest tracks on the album. The band claimed that it was banned in San Francisco—Reed said that this was because of the former's references to drugs and the latter's references to sex.

The album was released on January 30, 1968. The original pressing of the record incorrectly listed the track "Here She Comes Now" as "There She Comes Now". Initially, the band had a high ego after its release, but were nevertheless disappointed by its lack of promotion from MGM. Like the band's debut, it was banned on radio, and was a commercial disappointment. It peaked at position 199 on the Billboard Top LPs chart, which was lower than their debut. Although the band was disappointed by Verve and MGM's lack of promotion, Verve nevertheless ran a full-page ad in Rolling Stone and ran other ads in underground newspapers, including a full-page one in Hullabaloo, a teen magazine. Verve also ran radio ads advertising "The Gift" and also used the band's history with Warhol as a selling point. MGM included songs from the album as a part of a promotional set of interviews and songs—the set includes an interview with the band members. Bockris, another biographer of Reed's, said that the reaction to it was "even harsher... than the first", with particular criticism directed towards its transgressive lyrics. The band had difficulties distributing the single "White Light/White Heat" and received the most revenue through touring. They also had difficulties attracting larger audiences, even after promotion after appearing at Warhol's Exploding Plastic Inevitable. Ultimately, tension between Reed and Cale led to Cale being fired in a meeting called by Reed.

Cover artwork 

The original album cover for White Light/White Heat is a faint image of a tattoo of a skull. The tattoo was that of Joe Spencer, who played the lead role in Warhol's 1967 film Bike Boy. Spencer starred as a hustler in a motorcycle gang and is seen taking a shower in the movie. Although he was not credited for the cover design as with their debut, it was Warhol's idea to use a black-on-black picture of the tattoo. Reed selected the image from the negatives from the film, and it was enlarged and distorted by Billy Name, one of the members of the Factory. Morrison, however, states that the cover was picked by him. On the physical version of the album, this can only be seen when viewing the cover from a certain angle. On the back of the album is a photo of the band members at the Boston Tea Party, a concert venue. Morrison chose the photo and liked it, while Tucker thought that both she and Reed looked terrible on it.

There also exists a unique MGM Records UK cover, made in 1971, featuring a white background and abstract toy soldiers. The UK cover was not authorized by the band members. In 1974, the album was reissued by MGM under the title Archetypes. The cover of this version features two men wearing helmets standing in front of a Woolworth's.

Reception 

Like other releases by the group, the lyrical themes and avant-garde instrumentation of White Light/White Heat did not resonate with mainstream audiences at the time. For example, Rolling Stone refused to review the record. Though Billboard predicted that the album would become a hot-seller for record stores catering to underground acts, it only briefly appeared on the Billboard Top LPs chart. For Record Mirror, Peter Jones and Norman Jopling called it "a hippy must", with repetitive, "growling" blues-style instrumentation and deadpan vocals. The reviewers singled out "Sister Ray" as "behemoth" while comparing "The Gift" to Dylan Thomas' 1940s radio drama Under Milk Wood. A reviewer for Billboard called the lyrics "interesting" and the narrative-heavy songs such as "The Gift" joyful, albeit drowned out by the "pulsating instrumentation". Melody Maker, on the other hand, wrote off the album as "utterly pretentious, unbelievably monotonous". Peter Reilly of HiFi/Stereo Review, while erroneously describing the album's release as headed by Warhol, assigned the album ratings of "fair" for recording, "distinct" for stereo quality, and "not so good" for performance.

Wayne McGuire, writing for The Boston Sound, praised Cale's bass playing, particularly on "White Light/White Heat", calling him one of the best contemporary bass players. McGuire also considered the album a symbol of progression for the band. Sandy Pearlman, writing for Crawdaddy, noted its technological and "mechanical" sound while questioning why Warhol wasn't credited for contributing to its cover. The Listeners Tim Souster praised "Sister Ray", saying the track shows "pop is at last making decisive steps in a direction with far-reaching implications for the creative development not only of pop itself but of 'serious' music too". Internationally, Dutch magazine HitWeek gave the album a positive review, while noting its poor sound quality. British magazine NME noted its short track list and called it "weirdo stuff". Disc found it to be "staggering". A detailed review by Gene Youngblood in the underground newspaper Los Angeles Free Press praised the album, declaring it unique and ahead of its time like the band's debut. Lenny Kaye of New Times said the cover artwork could be juxtaposed with that of The Velvet Underground & Nico.

Legacy 

Retrospective reviews have been much more positive, and White Light/White Heat eventually sold over half a million copies internationally before Reed's death in 2013.

David Fricke of Rolling Stone, in a 1985 review of the first three records of the band, said it stood out even compared with contemporary songs, stating that no wave and hardcore songs didn't meet its "sheer industrial discord and locomotive propulsion". Reviewing the deluxe edition of the record, Douglas Walk of Pitchfork labeled it a "best new issue". Walk called the album "mysterious" and “a relentless, screeching, thudding, scoffing assault on the pop sensibilities of its time". Thomas Hobbs, in a review for Crack, praised its production but was divided on its lyrics, saying they “make it a record that's a lot harder to love; perhaps that was the aim all along".

Other reviews praised the album's abrasive production. Mark Deming of AllMusic considered it "easily the least accessible" of the band's albums, saying: "anyone wanting to hear their guitar-mauling tribal frenzy straight with no chaser will love it, and those benighted souls who think of the Velvets as some sort of folk-rock band are advised to crank their stereo up to ten and give side two a spin." Greg Kot of Chicago Tribune described the album as "Loud, abrasive, chilling-the perfect antidote for the Age of Aquarius." The Guardian singled out the track "Sister Ray," saying the only appropriate sound to follow the "brutal improvisational workout... is silence". Record Collector contended that it "was as near as the VU ever got to sounding trippily à la mode in 1967-68, even if it remains as streaked with street dirt as a discarded pie." Unterberger said the album was perhaps the "loudest... of all time."

White Light/White Heat contains a distorted, feedback-driven, and roughly recorded sound, which is regarded as influential; it foreshadowed the start of punk rock and the no wave genre. The Social Distortion album White Light, White Heat, White Trash would be named after White Light/White Heat. Oregano Rathbone of uDiscoverMusic said the record signalled a significant turn in rock music and for the band; similarly, Mike Boehm of the Los Angeles Times considered it a "raw, brutal milestone in the development of what would become punk rock". Joe Viglione of AllMusic called it a grunge classic. Tracks from the record were covered by underground and contemporary artists. British rock band Buzzcocks were formed by Pete Shelley and Howard Devoto out of a shared interest in "Sister Ray". A live cover of "Sister Ray" by British rock band Joy Division, recorded at the Moonlight Club in London on April 2, 1980, was included on the band's 1981 compilation album Still. Jonathan Richman made the song "Roadrunner" with inspiration from "Sister Ray"; the single was influential in its own right and was ranked on Rolling Stone's 500 Greatest Songs of All Time. David Bowie performed the album's title track routinely after May 1973, and Nirvana covered "Here She Comes Now" in 1990. Reed later boasted that  "no group in the world can touch what we did" on the album.

Rankings 
White Light/White Heat has been included in several lists by music publications as one of the greatest albums of the 1960s decade and of all time. It was listed at number 292 on Rolling Stone magazine's 2003 list of The 500 Greatest Albums of All Time, with the ranking slipping to number 293 in the 2012 revision and climbing to number 272 in the 2020 reboot of the list. It was voted number 309 in the third edition of Colin Larkin's All Time Top 1000 Albums (2000). Pitchfork ranked it number 26 on its list of the best albums of the 1960s, behind Stand! by Sly and the Family Stone. NME ranked it number 89 in its inaugural 1974 list of the top 100 albums of all time, eventually listing it as number 352 on its list of the 500 Greatest Albums of All Time, behind Sweetheart of the Rodeo by the Byrds. The album has been listed in unranked "best of" lists, such as Ultimate Classic Rock's top 100 albums of the 1960s. NME additionally included it on its "101 Albums To Hear Before You Die". Internationally, French magazine Rock & Folk listed it in its 555 albums from 1954–2014, and Italian magazine  listed it as a rock milestone.

Robert Dimery included the album in the 2018 edition of his book 1001 Albums You Must Hear Before You Die. Based on its appearances in professional rankings and listings, the aggregate website Acclaimed Music lists White Light/White Heat as the 10th most acclaimed album of 1968, the 43rd most acclaimed album of the 1960s and the 199th most acclaimed album in history.

Reissues 
The album was reissued under the title Archetypes by MGM in 1974, though the reason for this is unknown. It was out of print in the United States until 1985, when it received a reissue, along with the group's first three albums. These reissues were unexpectedly successful, which led to further releases under PolyGram such as Another View. The album was included in the box set Peel Slowly and See, and was later reissued as a Super Deluxe edition for its 45th Anniversary, including mono versions of tracks, demos, and live performances.

Track listing

Personnel 
Derived from journalist David Fricke and the album's back cover.

The Velvet Underground
 Lou Reed – vocals, guitar, rhythm guitar, piano
 John Cale – vocals, electric viola, Vox Continental organ, bass guitar, medical sound effects 
 Sterling Morrison – guitar, bass guitar, vocals, medical sound effects 
 Maureen Tucker – percussion, drums 

Technical personnel
 Gary Kellgren – recording engineer
 Bob Ludwig – mastering
 Val Valentin – director of engineering
 Tom Wilson – production

Certifications

Notes

References

Citations

Sources

External links
 

1968 albums
Albums produced by Tom Wilson (record producer)
Protopunk albums
The Velvet Underground albums
Verve Records albums
Experimental rock albums